This is a glossary of graph theory. Graph theory is the study of graphs, systems of nodes or vertices connected in pairs by lines or edges.

Symbols

A

B

C

D

E

F

G

H

I

K

L

M

N

O

P

Q

R

S

T

U

V

W

See also

 List of graph theory topics
 Gallery of named graphs
 Graph algorithms
 Glossary of areas of mathematics

References

Graph theory
Glossaries of mathematics
Wikipedia glossaries using description lists

he:גרף (תורת הגרפים)#תת גרף